Nadezhda Nikolaevna Roshchina (born 30 June 1954) is a Russian rower who competed for the Soviet Union in the 1976 Summer Olympics. She was 184 cm tall and weighed 14st.

In 1976 she was a crew member of the Soviet boat which won the silver medal in the eights event.

References

External links
 profile

1954 births
Living people
Russian female rowers
Soviet female rowers
Olympic rowers of the Soviet Union
Rowers at the 1976 Summer Olympics
Olympic silver medalists for the Soviet Union
Olympic medalists in rowing
Medalists at the 1976 Summer Olympics